The 2005 Soul Train Music Awards were held on March 12, 2005 at the Paramount Studios in Los Angeles, California. The show was hosted by Brian McKnight, Fantasia, Nick Cannon and Nicole Richie.

Special awards

Quincy Jones Award for Outstanding Career Achievements
 Ice Cube

Sammy Davis, Jr. Award for "Entertainer of the Year" – Male
 Usher

Sammy Davis, Jr. Award for "Entertainer of the Year" – Female
 Ciara

Winners and nominees
Winners are in bold text.

Best R&B/Soul Album – Male
 Usher – Confessions
 R. Kelly – Happy People/U Saved Me
 Musiq – Soulstar
 Prince – Musicology

Best R&B/Soul Album – Female
 Alicia Keys – The Diary of Alicia Keys
 Brandy – Afrodisiac
 Ciara – Goodies
 Jill Scott – Beautifully Human: Words and Sounds Vol. 2

Best R&B/Soul Album – Group, Band or Duo
 Destiny's Child – Destiny Fulfilled
 112 – Hot & Wet
 Boyz II Men – Throwback, Vol. 1
 New Edition – One Love

Best R&B/Soul Single – Male
 Usher – "Confessions Part II"
 Anthony Hamilton – "Charlene"
 Mario – "Let Me Love You"
 Prince – "Call My Name"

Best R&B/Soul Single – Female
 Alicia Keys – "If I Ain't Got You"
 Beyoncé – "Naughty Girl"
 Ciara  – "Goodies"
 Jill Scott – "Golden"

Best R&B/Soul Single – Group, Band or Duo
 Usher and Alicia Keys – "My Boo"
 Destiny's Child – "Lose My Breath"
 New Edition – "Hot 2Nite"
 Luther Vandross and Beyoncé – "The Closer I Get to You"

The Michael Jackson Award for Best R&B/Soul or Rap Music Video
 Jay Z – "99 Problems"
 OutKast – "Roses"
 Usher  – "Yeah!"
 Kanye West – "Jesus Walks"

The Coca-Cola Classic Award for Best R&B/Soul or Rap New Artist
 Ciara
 Fantasia
 J-Kwon
 John Legend

The Sprite Award for Best R&B/Soul or Rap Dance Cut
 Usher  – "Yeah!"
 Ciara  – "Goodies"
 Snoop Dogg  – "Drop It Like It's Hot"
 LL Cool J – "Headsprung"

Best Gospel Album
 Israel and New Breed – Live From Another Level
 Karen Clark-Sheard – The Heavens Are Telling
 J Moss – The J Moss Project
 Kierra "Kiki" Sheard – I Owe You

Performers
 Anthony Hamilton
 Brian McKnight
 Ciara and Petey Pablo
 Fantasia
 Kierra "Kiki" Sheard
 Karen Clark Sheard
 Nick Cannon
 J-Kwon, Petey Pablo and Ebony Eyess

References

Soul Train Music Awards, 2005
Soul Train Music Awards
2005 in American music
Soul
Soul